The 2017–18 Sunfoil Series was a first-class cricket competition that took place in South Africa from 19 September 2017 to 25 March 2018. Knights were the defending champions.

There was a planned break in the competition between October and February for the first season of the T20 Global League (TGL). However, the TGL was postponed to November 2018, with South Africa's domestic T20 competition moved back from March 2018 to November 2017 to replace it.

After the first four rounds of fixtures, all twelve matches had ended in draws. The first win of the tournament came in the fifth round, when Titans beat Lions by nine wickets. By the end of the mid-season break in October 2017, fourteen of the fifteen matches had ended as a draw. Ahead of the final round of fixtures, five of the six teams were still in contention of winning the title.

Titans won the series, after they beat Knights by four wickets in the final round of matches.

Points table

Fixtures

Round 1

Round 2

Round 3

Round 4

Round 5

Round 6

Round 7

Round 8

Round 9

Round 10

References

External links
 Series home at ESPN Cricinfo

South African domestic cricket competitions
Sunfoil Series
2017–18 South African cricket season
Sunfoil Series